Ninfa plebea, internationally released as The Nymph, is a 1996 Italian comedy-drama film directed by Lina Wertmüller. It is based on the Premio Strega winning novel with the same name by Domenico Rea.

Cast 
 Raoul Bova: Pietro 
 Lucia Cara: Miluzza
 Stefania Sandrelli: Nunziata 
 Isa Danieli: Gesummia 
 Peppe De Rosa: Don Peppe 
 Lorenzo Crespi: Dino 
Simona Patitucci : Rosinella 
 Giuditta del Vecchio: Annuzza
 Lola Pagnani: Lucia

References

External links

1996 films
1996 comedy-drama films
Italian comedy-drama films
Films directed by Lina Wertmüller
Films scored by Ennio Morricone
Films with screenplays by Ugo Pirro
1990s Italian films